West Township is located in McLean County, Illinois. As of the 2010 census, its population was 216 and it contained 94 housing units. West Township changed its name from Kickapoo Township on May 17, 1858.

Geography

Demographics

References

External links
City-data.com
Illinois State Archives

Townships in McLean County, Illinois
Townships in Illinois